Pultenaea viscidula, commonly known as dark bush-pea, is a species of flowering plant in the family Fabaceae and is endemic to South Australia. It is an erect shrub with branches that are sticky when young, linear to cylindrical, channelled leaves with stipules at the base, and yellow to orange and yellow-red to green flowers.

Description

Taxonomy and naming
Pultenaea viscidula was first formally described in 1885 by Ralph Tate in Transactions, proceedings and report, Royal Society of South Australia from specimens he collected near Karatta on Kangaroo Island "under the shade of Eucalyptus corynocalyx". The specific epithet (viscidula) means "slightly sticky".

Distribution and habitat
Dark bush-pea grows in woodland and heathland and is common in western and northern parts of Kangaroo Island and in a few places on the Fleurieu Peninsula in South Australia.

References

viscidula
Flora of Victoria (Australia)
Plants described in 1885
Taxa named by Ralph Tate